The Wizard in the Woods is a children's fantasy book by Jean Ure and the first book of The Wizard trilogy. It was published in 1990.

Plot
The story begins with the wizard exam of second class jr. wizard Ben Muzzy. Things go awry when he accidentally teleports himself to a mysterious forest. There he meets twins named Gemma and Joel who pledge to help the lost wizard find his way back home.

External links
 http://www.fantasticfiction.co.uk/u/jean-ure/wizard-in-woods.htm

1990 British novels
1990 children's books
Candlewick Press books
Children's fantasy novels
British children's novels
Wizards in fiction